Alfred Aloysius "Trader" Horn (born Alfred Aloysius Smith; 1861–1931) was an ivory trader in central Africa. He wrote a book, Trader Horn, detailing his journeys. The book also documents his efforts to free slaves; meet the founder of Rhodesia, Cecil Rhodes; and liberate a princess from captivity.

A silent film exists of Horn, as do recent writings about him online  and a biography by Tim Couzens.

Film adaptations
Trader Horn (1931)
Trader Horn (1973)

Complete title
Horn, Alfred Aloysius. Trader Horn; Being the Life and Works of Aloysius Horn, an "Old Visiter" ... the works written by himself at the age of seventy-three and the life, with such of his philosophy as is the gift of age and experience, taken down and here edited by Ethelreda Lewis; With a foreword by John Galsworthy. New York: Garden City Publishing, 1927, 302pp.

Later editions

Other works
 list of publications and editions

Notes

External links
 

 
1861 births
1931 deaths
Explorers of Africa